Ngati Haua may refer to:
 Ngāti Hāua, a tribe of the upper Whanganui River, New Zealand
 Ngāti Hauā, a tribe of the Waikato, New Zealand
 Ngāti Haua, a subtribe of Ngāruahine, of Taranaki, New Zealand
 Ngāti Haua, a subtribe of Te Rarawa, of Northland, New Zealand